Ratliff is a surname of British origin, which is a habitational name for a person from any of the places in Britain called Ratcliffe, Radcliffe, or Redcliff, which in turn are variants on the phrase  "red cliff". The surname may also be spelled Ratcliff, Radcliff, Ratcliffe, or Radcliffe. Ratliff may refer to:

Daniel Radcliffe  (born 1989), English actor, best known for playing Harry Potter in the film series.
Melissa Ratcliff (born 1976), American politician
Alfonso Ratliff (born 1956), American boxer
Bennett Ratliff (born 1961), American politician
Bill Ratliff (born 1936), American politician
Bo Ratliff (born 1933), American singer
Don Ratliff (born 1950), American football player
Ellington Ratliff (born 1993), American musician 
Evan Ratliff (born 1976), American journalist 
Jeremiah Ratliff (born 1981), American football player
Keiwan Ratliff (born 1981), American football player
Martha Ratliff (born 1946), American linguist
Mishon Ratliff (born 1993), American actor
 Spencer Ratcliff (born 1947) Anglo Australian journalist, author and musical creator
Theo Ratliff (born 1973), American basketball player
Walter Ratliff (born 1971), American journalist
Wayne Ratliff (born 1946), American computer scientist
William Ratliff (1937–2014), American political scientist

In fiction

V.K. Ratliff, a character and sometimes narrator in William Faulkner's novels, The Hamlet, The Town, and The Mansion. He also makes appearances in some other Faulkner novels and stories.

See also
Ratliff City, Oklahoma
Ratliff Stadium, Texas

References

Surnames of British Isles origin
English-language surnames